Hannah Greenwood is an Australian stage and television actress, best known for starring as Saskia Litras in the Australian children's television series Noah and Saskia.

Background
Greenwood currently lives in Melbourne, Australia. She has been involved in theatre production since she was 11 years old, and has been involved with modelling, singing and numerous voice-overs.  She graduated year 12 from Fintona Girls' School in 2005, and attended drama classes at the Australian College of Dramatic Arts and the Victorian Youth Theatre. She was accepted into the Western Australian Academy of Performing Arts in 2007, and said that she does not plan to take another role until 2010.

Career
Hannah most recently performed in the play 'Salonika Bound'.
Her television credits include Legacy of the Silver Shadow, Horace & Tina, High Flyers, Short Cuts, Stingers, State Coroner, Blue Heelers and Neighbours. On Neighbours, Greenwood played the part of Teresa Cammeniti.

Filmography
State Coroner (1 episode, 1998) (TV)
Stingers (1 episode, 1999) (TV)
High Flyers (1999) (TV)
Horace & Tina (18 episodes, 2001) (TV)
Short Cuts (1 episode, 2002) (TV)
Legacy of the Silver Shadow (2002) (TV)
Noah & Saskia (13 episodes, 2004) (TV)
Blue Heelers (2 episodes, 2002–2005) (TV)
Neighbours (6 episodes, 2006) (TV)

References

External links

Hannah Greenwood Google Fan Group 
Black Rock, a stage production featuring Hannah Greenwood

1987 births
Living people
Australian television actresses
Australian stage actresses
Actresses from Melbourne
20th-century Australian actresses
21st-century Australian actresses